The Union of Marxists (SM) is a communist organization in Russia, founded on November 2–3, 2019 by Andrey Rudoy, editor-in-chief of the left-wing magazine Vestnik Buri, YouTube blogger and trade union activist, and Station Marx news resource. The organization considers itself neither  Stalinist nor Trotskyist.

The movement participated in the 2021 protests  and the 2022 anti-war protests.

In March 2022, a split occurred in the movement, and a part associated with Station Marx organized a new organization "New Reds".

References

2019 establishments in Russia
Civil disobedience
Communist organizations in Russia
Far-left politics in Russia
Opposition to Vladimir Putin
Organizations established in 2019